Day by Day is a Soviet drama TV series directed by Vsevolod Shilovsky and written by . It ran for 17 episodes from 1971 to 1972. It was the first dramatic television series filmed by Soviet Central Television.

Plot
The series revolves around the residents of a large communal apartment, who belong to different families, in particular, the Yakushevs and Banykins. Neighbors become almost relatives, and their fate is closely intertwined. The old house is going to be scrapped, and all neighbors will have to be resettled in different apartments.

Cast
 Vyacheslav Nevinny as Viktor Banykin
 Nina Sazonova as  aunt Pasha
 Alexey Gribov as uncle Yura
 Yuri Gorobets as Konstantin Yakushev, painter
 Nina Popova as Zhenya Yakusheva
 Alexey Borzunov as Tolich
 Yevgeni Lazarev as Boris
 Alexey Eybozhenko as Sedoy
  as Ksenia
 Valentin Nikulin as  Dima
  as Pakhomov
 Kira Golovko as Kira Nikolaevna, Tolich's mother   
 Angelina Stepanova as Sokolova
 Yevgeniya Khanayeva as Antonina Mikhalyova
  as Anastasia Nikolaevna
 Vsevolod Shilovsky as  Zhora
 Dzidra Ritenberga as Dzidra Arturovna
 Anastasia Zuyeva as  old nurse
 Vitali Konyayev as Igor
  as Afanasy Muravyov
 Mark Prudkin as    Bogdanov
 Vladimir Grammatikov as filmmaker
 Valeriya Zaklunna as episode
 Vitali Bezrukov as episode

Soundtrack
 Valentin Nikulin – Song of the Circus, On the Relativity of Age, Aelita
 Valentina Tolkunova – Vocalise, Drip-drip, At Night I Walked Down the Street, Sound of Footsteps, Forgive Me, Tree, Vocalise Intermedia
 Vladimir Troshin – Sip Water, In the German Far Side
 Vladimir Makarov – Comrade, Memories of Moscow
 Yuri Gorobets – I Dreamed of Raw Rattle
 Nina Sazonova – I Stand on the Train Station
 Lev Leshchenko – She was All Right

References

External links
 
  Day by Day  at the Russia-K

1971 Soviet television series debuts
1972 Soviet television series endings
1970s Soviet television series
Russian drama television series
1971 in the Soviet Union
Soviet television miniseries
1970s Russian-language films